John van Rijswijck (born 16 January 1962) is a former Luxembourg football player. A goalkeeper, he played for the Luxembourg national football team from 1984 to 1993. His club career was entirely within Luxembourg, mostly for Jeunesse Esch.

International career
He made his debut for Luxembourg in a May 1984 friendly match against Norway and earned a total of 43 caps, scoring no goals. His final international was a May 1993 World Cup qualification match against Iceland.

References

External links
 

1962 births
Living people
Association football goalkeepers
Luxembourgian footballers
Luxembourg international footballers
Jeunesse Esch players
Union Luxembourg players
CS Hobscheid players
FC Swift Hesperange players
Luxembourg National Division players